James Allen Collins (born September 23, 1976) is an American Funeral director and politician from Georgia. Collins is the former mayor of Villa Rica, Georgia and a Republican member of the Georgia House of Representatives for District 68.

Early life 
Collins' parents are a school teacher and a grocer. Collins' grandfather was J. Edwin Busbin, a funeral home director. Collins attended Villa Rica Elementary School.

Education  
Collins attended West Georgia College. In February 2000, Collins graduated from Gupton-Jones College of Funeral Service. In September 2000, Collins received his license as a Funeral Director and Embalmers.

Career 
In 1997, Collins began working in funeral service. On July 1, 2002, Collins became a funeral home director and owner of J. Collins Funeral Home & Cremation Service in Villa Rica, Georgia.

In November 2003, Collins was elected as the youngest mayor of Villa Rica, Georgia. Collins served as mayor until 2016. Mike Williamson served as interim Mayor until a new mayor was elected in November 2016.

On November 8, 2016, Collins won the election unopposed and became a Republican member of Georgia House of Representatives for District 68. On November 6, 2018, as an incumbent, Collins won the election unopposed and continued serving District 68. On November 3, 2020, as an incumbent, Collins won the election unopposed and continued serving District 68. On November 8, 2022, Collins beat Democrat Afoma Eguh Okafor to represent District 71.

Personal life 
Collins' former wife is Kim Collins. They have one child. Police responded to a domestic violence 911 call in 2016, but no charges were filed. Collins married Holly Reece in 2021.

References

External links 
 J. Collins at ballotpedia.org
 J. Collins at congressweb.com
 John A. J. Collins at ourcampaigns.com
 jcollinsfuneralhome.com

21st-century American politicians
American funeral directors
University of West Georgia alumni
Republican Party members of the Georgia House of Representatives
Living people
1976 births